Dolichoderus semirugosus is a species of ant in the genus Dolichoderus. Described by Mayr in 1870, the species is endemic Borneo and Thailand.

References

Dolichoderus
Hymenoptera of Asia
Insects of Borneo
Insects of Thailand
Insects described in 1870